The 1960 season of the Primera División Peruana, or the Peruvian Football Championship, the top category of Peruvian football (soccer), was played by 10 teams. The season was a single league table played on a home-and-away round-robin basis. The champions qualified for the Copa Libertadores 1961, the first Copa Libertadores to have a Peruvian team participate. The last placed team at the end of the season was relegated. The champions were Universitario and Mariscal Castilla was relegated.

Table

Standings

Top scorer

External links 
 Peru 1960 season at RSSSF
 Peruvian Football League News 

Peru1
1960 in Peruvian football
Peruvian Primera División seasons